Zabin may refer to the following places in Poland:
Żabin, Lower Silesian Voivodeship (south-west Poland)
Żabin, Masovian Voivodeship (east-central Poland)
Żabin, Warmian-Masurian Voivodeship (north Poland)
Żabin, West Pomeranian Voivodeship (north-west Poland)
Ząbin, Kuyavian-Pomeranian Voivodeship (north-central Poland)
Żabin Łukowski, Gmina Karniewo, Maków County, Masovian Voivodeship
Stary Żabin (Old Żabin), in Gmina Banie Mazurskie, Gołdap County, Warmian-Masurian Voivodeship

See also
 Mashal Mohammed Zabin, Jordanian general